Onizuka may refer to:

People with the surname
Ellison Onizuka (1946–1986), U.S astronaut who died in the 'Challenger' accident
Katsuya Onizuka (born 1970), WBA Super Flyweight champion from Kitakyushu, Japan

Places named after Ellison Onizuka 
Onizuka Air Force Station, a military station in Sunnyvale, California
Onizuka Center for International Astronomy, a visitor information center at Mauna Kea, Hawaii
Onizuka Space Center at Kona International Airport, Hawaii
Onizuka (crater), a crater on the moon

Fictional
Great Teacher Onizuka, a 1999 live-action, anime and manga series
 Eikichi Onizuka, the titular character in the series

Other uses
 Onizuka Station, Karatsu City, Saga Prefecture, Japan

Japanese-language surnames